Bombay and Bandra Bakar Kasai Jamat Mosques Trust is a 300-year-old trust public trust based in Mumbai. It was constructed and is maintained by the Jama Masjid, Bandra. It is one of the oldest trusts in India.

History

Bakar Kasai Jamaat was originally headquartered in South Mumbai, but later shifted to Bandra, a suburb of Mumbai. The trust was initiated by a group of goat merchants and butchers from Mumbai. The trust runs various social initiatives like masjid, schools and cultural centres.

Political dignitaries like Rahul Gandhi have visited institutes run by the trust.

Masjids

 Jama Masjid, Bandra
 Naupada Masjid and Kabrastan (graveyard)

Education

 Bandra Urdu High School
 Bandra Crescent English School
 Junior College of Science, Commerce & MCVC

Social centres

 Jamaat Khana, Bandra

References 

Mosques in Mumbai